ANSR is a business consulting company. It was established in 2004 by Lalit Ahuja. Since its inception, ANSR has established over 85 GCCs aggregating to over 85k enterprise talent with over $1.6B in investment.

History 
Lalit Ahuja founded the company in 2004, along with D.P Narayana, Thomas W. Sisson, and David Reed. A retired Navy lieutenant and a global entrepreneur, Ahuja is the former chief executive officer of the Indian arm of Target Corporation.

The firm works with multinationals to create their offshore capability centers in India. It has established more than 85 GCCs in India and invested over $1.6 billion in capital infrastructure to fuel innovation. In 2015, Infosys bought a 5% stake in ANSR  for $1.4 million. In 2015, ANSR raised $6.7M Series-A from Accel Partners and in 2021, $15M in Series-B  from Sistema Asia and Evolvence India.

Government Association 
Ahuja was chosen as a special representative by Chandrababu Naidu to make Visakhapatnam a preferable destination for captive units. In 2017, the Andhra Pradesh cabinet cleared the proposal by ANSR Consulting to create one of the largest financial technology facilities in Fintech Valley, Visakhapatnam. The AP Industrial Infrastructure Corporation (APHC) allotted 10 acres of land from the IT Special Economic Zone; in lieu of the land, the government will retain equity in the financial technology project.

In 2021, ANSR  partnered with GIFT City, India's only operational International Financial Services Centre (IFSC), to attract GCCs to set up high-end processing centres related to financial services at GIFT City. The central government notified GICs as a financial service relating to financial products and financial services under the IFSCA Act on October 16, 2020.

Kyron 
Kyron Global is the innovation arm of ANSR. It is a global startup accelerator and has incubated multiple startups. In 2015, Kyron received $9 million funding from Accel Partners and others to create an engagement program in which global startups can interact and learn directly from partnered multinationals early in their startups; it can also facilitate the founding of more GCCs in India.

While connecting startups with multinationals, Kyron gives access to a global network of investors and takes equity from the incubated startups. The focus is on retail, financial technology, media, and educational sectors. It aims to have a $50 million venture fund to invest in other startups and expand their industrial segments.

As of 2017, Kyron Global has been shut down

Techstars 
In 2017, ANSR and Techstars formed a joint venture to launch Bangalore City Accelerator, and associated corporate accelerator programs in India, tapping into the Indian startup ecosystem. The purpose of the joint venture is to convert promising business ideas into sustainable business models.

x10 By ANSR 

In 2019, ANSR launched a subsidiary named x10 by ANSR as a management consultancy based in Bengaluru. It was launched as a company that helps businesses to set up a distributed software engineering teams in India for their tech needs. They provide services for hiring the talent, managing workspaces, and all overheads needed to run a Center of Excellence (CoE) and claim to do it all in under 100 days.

Talent500 By ANSR 

Launched in 2019 as a subsidiary of ANSR, Talent500 By ANSR is a job search platform for Software Engineers in India. They generate a profile for you with the information you provide them, including your work experience and a set of verified skills. Their AI-based algorithms then match your profile to jobs relevant to your skills and needs and recommends your profile to companies.

Official Website 
ANSR

x10 By ANSR

Talent500 By ANSR

References 

Companies based in Dallas
Business process outsourcing companies of India